David Caneda Pérez (born 30 January 1970) is a Spanish football manager and former player. He played mainly as a right winger.

Caneda's professional inputs as a player consisted of 16 appearances in Segunda División with CA Osasuna in the 1996–97 season. After retiring he became a manager, working mainly as an assistant to Pako Ayestarán before taking his first professional job with AEK Larnaca FC in February 2020.

Caneda's older brother Raúl is also a football manager.

References

External links

1970 births
Living people
People from O Salnés
Sportspeople from the Province of Pontevedra
Spanish footballers
Footballers from Galicia (Spain)
Association football wingers
Segunda División players
Segunda División B players
Tercera División players
Pontevedra CF footballers
Racing de Ferrol footballers
CD Castellón footballers
CA Osasuna players
Córdoba CF players
Terrassa FC footballers
Spanish football managers
AEK Larnaca FC managers
Spanish expatriate football managers
Spanish expatriate sportspeople in Mexico
Spanish expatriate sportspeople in Israel
Spanish expatriate sportspeople in Cyprus
Expatriate football managers in Cyprus